The 2nd Annual TV Week Logie Awards were presented in January 1960 at the Savoy Private Hotel in Melbourne. It was not televised. The awards were only for Melbourne television. All major cities had different stations. Hugh O'Brian was the guest host and  presented some awards on IMT. This article lists the winners of Logie Awards (Australian television) for 1960:

Awards

Star Of The Year (Gold Logie)
Winner:
Graham Kennedy

Other Awards
Program Of The Year
Winner:
77 Sunset Strip, GTV9

TV Highlight Of 1959
Winner:
Shell Presents series, GTV9

TV WEEK Special Award
Winner:
GTV9/ATN7 Interstate TV Link for Test Cricket

Australian Broadcasting Commission
Best Male Personality
Winner:
John Royle

Best Female Personality
Winner:
Ruth Nye

Best Program
Winner:
The Phil Silvers Show

Seven Network
Best Male Personality
Winner:
Don Bennetts

Best Female Personality
Winner:
Brenda Marshall

Best Program
Winner:
Father Knows Best

Nine Network
Best Male Personality
Winner:
Graham Kennedy

Best Female Personality
Winner:
Panda Lisner

Best Program
Winner:
In Melbourne Tonight

External links

Australian Television: 1959-1961 Logie Awards
TV Week Logie Awards: 1960

1960 television awards
1960 in Australian television
1960